Clagett Butte el.  is a mountain peak butte in the Gallatin Range in Yellowstone National Park.

Clagett Butte was named in 1926 by park photographer Jack Ellis Haynes and then superintendent Horace Albright to honor William H. Clagett (1838–1901), the Montana Territorial Delegate who put forth the Act of Dedication bill in Congress to create Yellowstone National Park.  Prior to 1926, the butte had several different names.  In 1885, park guide G. L. Henderson called it Temple Mountain.  That was the accepted local name for many years.  In 1887, members of the Arnold Hague geological survey called it Sentinel Butte and later in 1897, Signal Butte but these names never became official.

See also
 Mountains and mountain ranges of Yellowstone National Park

Notes

Landforms of Yellowstone National Park
Buttes of Wyoming